The 2023 Davis Cup World Group II Play-offs were held from 2 to 6 February 2023. The twelve winners of this round qualified for the 2023 Davis Cup World Group II while the twelve losers will play at the Group III of the corresponding continental zone.

Teams
Twenty-four teams will play for twelve spots in the World Group II, in series decided on a home and away basis.

These twenty-four teams are:
 12 losing teams from World Group II.
 12 teams from their Group III zone:
 3 from Europe
 3 from Asia/Oceania,
 3 from Americas, and
 3 from Africa.

The 12 winning teams from the play-offs will qualify for the World Group II and the 12 losing teams will play at the Group III of the corresponding continental zone.

#: Nations Ranking as of 28 November 2022.

Qualified teams

  (#42)
  (#46)
  (#50)
  (#52)
  (#53)
  (#54)
  (#57)
  (#58)
  (#59)
  (#60)
  (#61)
  (#62)

  (#64)
  (#65)
  (#66)
  (#67)
  (#68)
  (#69)
  (#71)
  (#73)
  (#74)
  (#76)
  (#77)
  (#84)

Results summary

Results

Zimbabwe vs. Uruguay

Georgia vs. Bolivia

Tunisia vs. Cyprus

Luxembourg vs. South Africa

Barbados vs. Pacific Oceania

Monaco vs. Dominican Republic

Venezuela vs. Hong Kong

Jordan vs. El Salvador

Jamaica vs. Estonia

Egypt vs. Paraguay

Ivory Coast vs. Morocco

Vietnam vs. Indonesia

References

External links
Draw

World Group